The canton of Melun-Nord is a French former administrative division, located in the arrondissement of Melun, in the Seine-et-Marne département (Île-de-France région). It was disbanded following the French canton reorganisation which came into effect in March 2015. It consisted of 7 communes, which joined the canton of Melun in 2015.

Demographics

Composition 
The canton of Melun-Nord was composed of 7 communes:
Maincy
Melun (partly)
Montereau-sur-le-Jard
Rubelles
Saint-Germain-Laxis
Vaux-le-Pénil
Voisenon

See also
Cantons of the Seine-et-Marne department
Communes of the Seine-et-Marne department

References

Melun Nord
2015 disestablishments in France
States and territories disestablished in 2015